Witness 11 is a 2012 short drama film directed by Sean Mitchell and starring Oleg Liptsin, Paul Guadarrama and Matt Shelton. It is based on the testimony of renowned German poet and playwright, Bertolt Brecht, during the height of the 1940s Red Scare.

The film was shot in 2012 at the Berkeley City Club in Berkeley, California.

Premise
Called before the House Un-American Activities Committee. (HUAC) during their notorious Hollywood Ten investigation, famed German playwright Bertolt Brecht must choose between betraying himself and his friends, and imprisonment.  In the end, Brecht testified that he had never been a member of the Communist Party.

Cast
Oleg Liptsin as Bertolt Brecht
Paul Guadarrama as Robert E. Stripling
Matt Shelton as Dalton Trumbo
Tatjana Dzambazova as Helene Brecht
Dean Enciroli as J. Parnell Thomas
Philip Estrin as Green
John Scacco as Rep. Vail
Steven Mann as Herbert Biberman
Fritz Zimmerman as Baumgardt
David Rosenthal as John Howard Lawson
Bret Grantham as Bartley Crum
Juliet Hilton as Barbara Brecht

References

External links

Kickstarter-funded films
2012 films
American drama short films
Films set in Washington, D.C.
Films about McCarthyism
Films about writers
Films shot in California
Cinema of the San Francisco Bay Area
American historical drama films
2010s historical drama films
Films set in 1947
2012 short films
2012 drama films
2010s English-language films
2010s American films